Brian Leonard Kilby (born 26 February 1938 in Coventry, England) is a retired marathon runner from Great Britain.

Athletics career
In 1962 when he won gold medal in the men's marathon at the European Championships and at the 1962 Commonwealth Games. Running in Port Talbot, Wales, on 6 July 1963, he ran his best time, 2:14:43, setting a world record. He represented Great Britain a year later, at the 1964 Summer Olympics in Tokyo, Japan, where he finished fourth in the men's marathon in 2:17:02.4, just 43.2 seconds behind then-reigning world record holder Basil Heatley, who took second place. He also represented Great Britain at the 1960 Summer Olympics in Rome, Italy, where he finished 29th in the men's marathon.

He represented England and won a gold medal in the marathon at the 1962 British Empire and Commonwealth Games in Perth, Western Australia.

Four years later he represented England in the marathon again, at the 1966 British Empire and Commonwealth Games in Kingston, Jamaica.

References

1938 births
Living people
Sportspeople from Coventry
English male marathon runners
Olympic athletes of Great Britain
Athletes (track and field) at the 1960 Summer Olympics
Athletes (track and field) at the 1964 Summer Olympics
Commonwealth Games gold medallists for England
Commonwealth Games medallists in athletics
Athletes (track and field) at the 1962 British Empire and Commonwealth Games
Athletes (track and field) at the 1966 British Empire and Commonwealth Games
European Athletics Championships medalists
Medallists at the 1962 British Empire and Commonwealth Games